Staggered is a 1994 British romantic comedy film starring and directed by Martin Clunes in his directorial debut. It follows the misfortune of Neil (Clunes), a bridegroom trying to get back to his intended bride after a stag night.

Plot
After his stag night, Neil Price (Martin Clunes) wakes up naked on a remote Scottish island. The film follows his journey back towards his wedding, and the various characters and obstacles he encounters en route. It turns out that Neil's best friend Gary Bicknell (Michael Praed) spiked his drink and dumped him on the Isle of Barra to enable him to make his own move on Hilary and her well-to-do family.

Cast

 Martin Clunes as Neil Price
 Michael Praed as Gary Bicknell
 Michele Winstanley as Tina
 Kate Byers as Jackie
 Sarah Winman as Hilary
 David Kossoff as Elderly Man
 Helena McCarthy as Elderly Woman
 Sylvia Syms as Margaret
 Sion Tudor Owen as Morris
 Virginia McKenna as Flora
 Jake D'Arcy as Pilot
 John Forgeham as Inspector Lubbock
 Dan Travers as Policeman
 Steve Sweeney as Nutter
 Dermot Crowley as Dr. Barnet
 Anna Chancellor as Carmen Svennipeg
 Bill Gavin as Old Man
 Griff Rhys Jones as Graham
 Julia Deakin as Brenda
 Annette Ekblom as Caroline
 Desmond McNamara as Traffic Policeman
 George Rossi as Waiter
 Paul Brightwell as Longcoat
 Ian Michie as Milkman
 Michael Medwin as Hilary's father
 Neil Morrissey as Jeff the Videographer
 Richard Syms as Vicar
 Gary Murphy as Mr. Elvis
 Amanda Hodge as Mrs. Elvis
 Abigail Hodge as Baby Elvis

Production
The film was Clunes' directorial debut. He said "I was asked, and it's not the sort of thing you say no to, really". It was shot in Barra, Western Isles, Scotland, Kent, London, and Newcastle upon Tyne England in 42 days on 24 May and 5 July 1993.

Reception
Time Out said that the film was a "low-budget farce has a frustrating tendency to set up promising situations only to squander them" but that the project was "amusing and eventful, none the less". The review in Variety had a similar take, although it singled out Chancellor's character, Carmen, as being the best in the film describing her as having "more dark currents than a buttered bun."

See also
 Dancing Queen (1993 film), a British short TV comedy film from the previous year (1993) which also follows the misfortune of a bridegroom trying to get back to his intended bride after a stag night, in which also Martin Clunes co-starred.

References

External links
 
 

1994 films
1994 directorial debut films
1994 romantic comedy films
British romantic comedy films
Films set in Kent
Films set in London
Films set in Newcastle upon Tyne
Films set in Scotland
1990s English-language films
1990s British films